Expedition of Khalid ibn al-Walid may refer to various expeditions by Khalid ibn al-Walid, including:

Expedition of Khalid ibn al-Walid (Banu Jadhimah), January 630 AD, 9th month of 8AH
Expedition of Khalid ibn al-Walid (Nakhla), January 630 AD, 9th month of 8AH
Expedition of Khalid ibn al-Walid (Dumatul Jandal) March 631 AD, 11th month of 9AH
Expedition of Khalid ibn al-Walid (2nd Dumatul Jandal), April 631 AD
Expedition of Khalid ibn al-Walid (Najran), June 631 AD, 10AH

See also
Khalid ibn al-Walid